Yankee Doodle Bugs is a 1954 Warner Bros. Looney Tunes cartoon short, written by Warren Foster and directed by Friz Freleng. The short was released on August 28, 1954, and stars Bugs Bunny.

In the short, Bugs' nephew Clyde has trouble remembering important dates and events in history in preparation for an exam, so Bugs offers to help. The cartoon's title is a humorous portmanteau of the American folk song "Yankee Doodle" and the word doodlebug.

Plot
Clyde is lying down on the floor doing his history homework for an exam at school, scratching down important dates in history and getting confused. After several moments, he exclaims: "I give up!". His uncle Bugs offers to help and proceeds to tell him how rabbits made American history.

In the first segment, in a trade of land with the Native American Indians, Bugs explains that Manhattan wasn't the bustling city you see today, but was rather, filled with Indian teepees. Bugs explains that the Statue of Liberty was "... just a little goil (girl) at the time".

In the second segment, Bugs is interacting with Benjamin Franklin on the day that Franklin discovered electricity. "What's up, Benny?" Bugs asks. Ben states: "I'm trying to discover electricity," and asks Bugs if he can tend to his kite (with a key tied on it, naturally), and that he must get out "... ye first edition of The Saturday Evening Post", so he hands his kite string to Bugs to look after until he gets back. Bugs sees a storm cloud approach, lightning hits the kite and travels down the string and electrocutes him. Ben runs back, picks up Bugs who is flashing off and on like a lightbulb, exclaiming "I discovered electricity! I discovered electricity!" Bugs looks at the camera and says: "Heh ... He discovered electricity!"

In the third segment, Bugs explains to Clyde about the Boston Tea Party. The King is seen approaching a worker in the Royal Tea Warehouse in Boston. With a box of hardware tacks in hand, he orders the worker to "Spread these tacks on the Colonist's tea". When the worker explains: "But Your Majesty, these are carpet tacks", the King dumps the tacks all over the place in a fit of insanity and exclaims: "Well, they're tea tacks now!" and exits, laughing all the way. Bugs explains to Clyde that the Colonists refused to drink their tea with tacks and that's how the Army was formed.

In the fourth segment, George Washington gets a letter in the mailbox, opens it and exclaims: "Gadzooks! I've been drafted!" He is then seen racing off on horseback to the Candy Shoppe, where he says to Martha Washington that she'll have to look after the candy stores  alone, while he is off to fight the war. He then races off screen, yelling "Charge!"

In the fifth segment, Bugs is seen approaching Betsy Ross' home where she is sewing an American flag (presumably after several failed design attempts, this is the first iteration of the flag - it has the 13 red and white colony stripes and blue field). He says: "Hiya Bets - how's the flag coming along?" She opens the flag displaying it and asks: "How's this, Mr. Bunny?" but Bugs makes a comment to Betsy that something is missing in the blue field. (Note the sign at the front gate that says: "Watch your step - Geo. Washington slipped here"). Pacing back and forth thinking hard about what can go in the blue field, Bugs unknowingly steps on a rake and the handle hits him in the head, forming a circle of stars around his head. He then looks at Betsy and asks: "Hey Betsy, does this give you an idea-r?" Betsy agrees, and starts sewing the stars into the blue space on the flag. That is how rabbits helped with the formation of the American flag.

The sixth segment has the enemy storming Bunker Hill. Of course, a cannon is pointed right at them, and as soon as they get close enough, the cannon goes off surprising the enemy, who then turn around and walk in the opposite direction, their uniforms and weapons in tatters.

The battle at Valley Forge is the seventh segment, where Bugs explains the hardships endured, including  of snow and frigid temperatures. An ice cream wagon is seen driving across the snow playing Yankee Doodle, and is immediately fired upon and explodes. The practically destroyed truck turns around in the opposite direction and rides off-scene.

The last segment opens with Bugs explaining "The enemy fleet was all bottled up", showing two ships in a bottle in a harbor, then shows Bugs steering a motor boat across the Delaware River with George Washington.

After Bugs tells Clyde all of these important historical events, the school bell is heard in the distance and Bugs rushes him off to school saying: "And don't forget what I told ya!" Later in the day, Clyde returns home with an angry look on his face and Bugs asks him: "Well, Clyde! How did you make out on your history exam?" Clyde puts a "Dunce cap" on his head and asks: "Does THIS answer your question?!"

Music
 "Yankee Doodle", traditional
 "The Red, White and Blue", aka "Columbia, Gem of the Ocean"
 "The Girl I Left Behind Me", traditional
 "You're a Horse's Ass", traditional

References

External links

1954 films
1954 animated films
1954 short films
1950s Warner Bros. animated short films
Looney Tunes shorts
Short films directed by Friz Freleng
American Revolutionary War films
Films scored by Milt Franklyn
Bugs Bunny films
1950s English-language films
Films about Native Americans
Films set in Boston
Films set in Manhattan
Cultural depictions of Benjamin Franklin
Cultural depictions of George Washington
Cultural depictions of Martha Washington
Cultural depictions of Betsy Ross